Albert VII may refer to:
 Albert VII, Archduke of Austria (1559–1621)
 Albert VII, Duke of Mecklenburg-Güstrow (1488–1547)

de:Liste der Herrscher namens Albrecht#Albrecht VII.